Festuca amplissima is a species of grass that are rhizomatous perennials. This species is endemic to Panama, Venezuela and Ecuador. Festuca amplissima has three subspecies, and one variety.
 Festuca amplissima subsp. amplissima
 Festuca amplissima var. elliptica
 Festuca amplissima subsp. sierra
 Festuca amplissima subsp. magdalenaensis

Characteristics
Festuca amplissima has loosely tufted flowers. It has brown glabrous leaves that are membranous and has culms that are erect, scabrous and grow from 100 to 120 centimetres tall. The ligules of this species grow from 0.5 - 0.7 millimetres long and the panicles are 20-25 centimetres long, 2-5 centimetres wide.

References

amplissima
Taxa named by Franz Josef Ruprecht
Plants described in 1842
Flora of Panama
Flora of Venezuela
Flora of Ecuador